Highland is the debut studio album by Swedish group One More Time, released in 1992.  In 1992, they began their international career with the release of the single "Highland", which peaked at number two in Sweden.

Track listing

Charts

References

One More Time (band) albums
1992 albums